Sir William Young Darling CBE FRSE LLD MC (8 May 1885 – 4 February 1962) was the Unionist Member of Parliament in the British House of Commons for the Edinburgh South constituency from 1945 to 1957. He was a director of the Royal Bank of Scotland from 1942 to 1957.

Life

He was born in Carlisle, the second son of William Darling of Edinburgh. He was educated firstly at James Gillespie's School then Daniel Stewart's College and Heriot-Watt College. The University of Edinburgh later awarded him an honorary Doctor of Laws (LLD).

In the First World War he joined the Black Watch as a private in 1914 and then after receiving a commission he joined the Royal Scots in 1915 as a 2nd Lieutenant. He saw much action and was wounded five times. He was awarded the Military Cross with bar and was Mentioned in Dispatches. From 1920 to 1922 he served in Ireland during the Irish War of Independence. During this period, together with Hugh Pollard (1888–1966), he jointly printed the Weekly Summary: a synopsis of the war from a British perspective. On leaving the army he became Director of the family drapers firm.

He became a member of Edinburgh Corporation in 1933 and was city treasurer from 1937 to 1940. He was Lord Provost of Edinburgh from 1941 to 1944; National Government Candidate for West Lothian, 1937; and chairman, Scottish Council on Industry, from 1942 to 1946.

He was appointed CBE in 1923 and knighted in 1943. In the Second World War he was Chief Air Raid Warden for Edinburgh from 1939 to 1941.

He died on 4 February 1962. He is buried in Traquair Parish Churchyard.

Publications
The first five books were published anonymously:
The Private Papers of a Bankrupt Bookseller (1931)
Hades! The Ladies!: Being Extracts from the Diary of a Draper, Charles Cavers, Esquire late of Bond Street London West (1933)
The Old Mill: Being the Candid Chronicles of Penelope Potter (1934)
Down but Not Out: Being the True Story of Peter Gogg (1935)
The Bankrupt Bookseller Speaks Again (1938)
Published under his own name:
Why I Believe in God (1944)
Published under the pseudonym "Timoleon":
King's Cross to Waverley: A Discursive Diary Telling of Persons and Policies, Opinions and Occurrences in Days of War (1944)
Published under his own name:
You and Your Neighbour: A Presentation of Local Government (1945) 
The Bankrupt Bookseller (omnibus edition) (1947)
A Book of Days: A Dictionary of Dates, a Chronology of Circumstance, the Face of Time (1951)
So it Looks to Me (1952) (autobiography)
A Westminster Lad (1955) (poems)

Family

He married Agnes Olive Simpson (1885–1962) in 1914.

He was the great uncle of Alistair Darling, an Edinburgh MP from 1987 to 2015 who held various ministerial and Cabinet posts in the Labour government from 1997 to 2010.

Artistic recognition

His portrait (as Lord Provost of Edinburgh), by Herbert James Gunn is held by the City of Edinburgh Council.

References

External links 
 

1885 births
1962 deaths
Alumni of the University of Edinburgh
Knights Bachelor
Politicians awarded knighthoods
Unionist Party (Scotland) MPs
Members of the Parliament of the United Kingdom for Scottish constituencies
UK MPs 1945–1950
UK MPs 1950–1951
UK MPs 1951–1955
UK MPs 1955–1959
Royal Scots officers
British Army personnel of World War II
Recipients of the Military Cross
People educated at Stewart's Melville College
Lord Provosts of Edinburgh
Members of the Parliament of the United Kingdom for Edinburgh constituencies
20th-century Scottish novelists
Civil Defence Service personnel